Changalnadu Lift Irrigation Scheme is a lift irrigation project located in Andhra Pradesh, India.

References

Irrigation in Andhra Pradesh
Lift irrigation schemes